Raymond Dominick Crisara (October 19, 1920 – May 25, 2014) was an American trumpeter and educator. He was the principal trumpet with the Metropolitan Opera Orchestra from 1941 to 1943. He was associate first trumpet with the NBC Symphony from 1946 to 1954. He was Professor of Trumpet at the University of Texas from 1978 to 2001.

Early life
Raymond Dominick Crisara was born in Cortland, New York, the son of Frank and Margaret Crisara.

Education
Raymond Crisara was a student at the Ernest Williams School of Music from 1937 to 1940. He then moved to the University of Michigan as a student and teaching assistant under Dr. William Revelli from 1940 to 1941.

Performance career
Raymont Crisara's first major professional gig came as a cornet soloist with The Goldman Band, replacing Frank Elsass. In the summer of 1941, Crisara, aged 19, auditioned for and was awarded the position of Principal Trumpet with the Metropolitan Opera Orchestra. In December 1942, Crisara was drafted into the US Army. After his release from the US Army in 1946, Crisara became associate 1st/3rd trumpet with the NBC Symphony under Arturo Toscanini, a position he held through 1954 when the orchestra was disbanded. He was an in demand studio musician, recording with Paul McCartney, Kiss, Janis Joplin, and Carole King. He performed for Frank Sinatra and Liza Minnelli.

Television shows
Wide, Wide World with Dave Garroway
The Jack Parr Show
The Dick Cavett Show
The Perry Como Show

Recordings
 Victory at Sea (1955) [RCA Victor Red Seal LM 1779]
 The All-Star Concert Band (1960)  [Golden Crest CR-4025]
 The Burke-Phillips All-Star Concert Band (1961) [Golden Crest CR-4040]
 Leroy Anderson Conducts Leroy Anderson (1954) [MCA 555] ("Bugler's Holiday" trumpet trio with James F. Burke (Musician) and John Ware)

Faculty Positions
University of Bridgeport 3 years
NYU (adjunct professor) 6 years
University of Texas 1978-2001

Awards
American Bandmasters Association

External links
International Trumpet Guild  Tribute Raymond Crisara
Raymond Crisara Teaching By Example

References

1920 births
Trumpet
2014 deaths
University of Michigan alumni
University of Texas faculty
United States Army personnel of World War II